Norman Alishan Bailey  is President of the Institute for Global Economic Growth, an international economic consultant, and a former US government official. He is an adjunct professor at the Institute of World Politics and teaches a course on "Economics for Foreign Policy Makers."

Employment at the National Security Council
Bailey served as Senior Director of International Economic Affairs for the United States National Security Council (NSC) between 1981 and 1983. During his employment at the NSC, Bailey, whose specialty was monitoring terrorism by tracking finances, was involved in the following events:

The investigation of the Bank of Credit and Commerce International (BCCI), which according to Bailey was involved in drug-running and arms-running transactions, as well as terrorism. There were allegations of a link between BCCI and the Central Intelligence Agency (CIA,) and Bailey was quoted in Newsweek saying that the CIA was not interested in "blowing the BCCI cover."

Selected publications
 Latin America: Politics, economics and Hemispheric Security
 Latin America in World Politics
 Portuguese Africa
 Operational Conflict Analysis
 The Mexican Time Bomb
 The Strategic Plan That Won the Cold War

References

External links
 Norman A. Bailey, biography at Institute for Global Economic Growth
 

Living people
American economists
United States National Security Council staffers
Year of birth missing (living people)